Events from the year 1503 in Ireland.

Incumbent
Lord: Henry VII

Events
Gerald FitzGerald, 9th Earl of Kildare married Elizabeth Zouche, daughter of John Zouche of Codnor

Births

Deaths

References

 
1500s in Ireland
Ireland
Years of the 16th century in Ireland